Bumetopia ohshimana is a species of beetle in the family Cerambycidae. It was described by Stephan von Breuning in 1939.

Subspecies
 Bumetopia ohshimana heiana Hayashi, 1963
 Bumetopia ohshimana ohshimana Breuning, 1939

References

Homonoeini
Beetles described in 1939